Combretum farinosum is a species of bushwillow in the genus Combretum, native to Central and South America. The species was first described Carl Sigismund Kunth.

References

farinosum